Turanodermatidae is an extinct family of earwigs in the order Dermaptera. There is one genus, Turanoderma, in Turanodermatidae.

References

Earwigs
Prehistoric insect families
Taxa named by Michael S. Engel